The 2005 Fáilte Ireland Irish Masters was a professional ranking snooker tournament that took place between 6–13 March 2005 at the Citywest Hotel in Dublin, Republic of Ireland. This was the last time the tournament was run as a ranking event.

Ronnie O'Sullivan won the title by defeating Matthew Stevens 10–8 in the final.

Prize fund
The breakdown of prize money for this year is shown below:

Winner: £40,000
Runner-up: £20,000
Semi-final: £10,000
Quarter-final: £7,000
Last 16: £5,000
Last 32: £3,100

Last 48: £1,775
Last 64: £1,375
Stage two highest break: £2,000
Stage two maximum break: £20,000
Total: £250,000

Main draw

Final

Qualifying 

Qualifying for the tournament took place between 10 and 13 January 2005 at Pontin's in Prestatyn, Wales.

Century breaks

Qualifying stage centuries 

 141, 125, 110  Ding Junhui
 138  Mark Selby
 138  Jamie Burnett
 132  Barry Pinches
 130  Gary Wilson
 128  Sean Storey
 127  Alfie Burden
 126  Joe Delaney
 125, 114  Dave Harold
 123, 104  Michael Holt
 116  Ali Carter

 115  Robert Milkins
 115  Sean O'Neill
 113  Shokat Ali
 111  Darren Morgan
 108  Mark Davis
 108  Brian Salmon
 103  Liu Song
 103  Joe Swail
 102  Ryan Day
 100  Barry Hawkins

Televised stage centuries 

 141, 105  Mark Williams
 140, 137, 128, 114, 108, 107, 104, 102  Ronnie O'Sullivan
 136  Stephen Maguire
 135, 133  Stephen Hendry
 135, 113, 101, 100  Matthew Stevens
 135  Chris Small
 132  Paul Hunter

 128  Barry Hawkins
 113  Robert Milkins
 112  David Gray
 110  Peter Ebdon
 110  Michael Judge
 105  Jimmy White

References

2005
Irish Masters
Masters
Irish Masters
Snooker ranking tournaments